The 2021–22 Asociación Deportiva Chalatenango season is the association's 91st season in existence. The association is playing in the Primera División de Fútbol de El Salvador, the highest level of football in El Salvador. Chalatenango finished in 7th place and reached the semifinals of the playoffs.

Players

Competitions

Primera División

League table

Results summary

Matches

Statistics

Goals

References 

Chalatenango